"Save Your Love (For #1)" is a 1985 song written and sung by the duo René & Angela from their album Street Called Desire. It was their first single (and album) for Mercury Records. The single also featured labelmate Kurtis Blow performing a rap, making it one first times hip hop artists collaborated with R&B artists on their work. The single was number one on the Billboard R&B chart for two weeks and was the duo's biggest hit on that chart.

References
 

1985 songs
1985 singles
René & Angela songs
Songs written by René Moore
Songs written by Angela Winbush